The 2019–20 NCAA Division I men's ice hockey season began on October 5, 2019 and was intended to conclude with the Frozen Four in April 2020. This would have been the 73rd season in which an NCAA ice hockey championship was held, and was US college hockey's 126th year overall. However, the postseason tournament was cancelled due to the COVID-19 pandemic.

In February, seven members that had previously announced their withdrawal from the WCHA following the 2020–21 season announced that they were reforming the Central Collegiate Hockey Association, and that the new conference would begin play with the 2021–22 season.

Due to the COVID-19 pandemic, the NCAA, along with several conferences, decided to ban spectators from attending many of the games played after March 10, 2020 including the 2020 Frozen Four. Additionally, due to the threat of infection, Harvard and Yale withdrew from their conference tournament on March 11, effectively ending their seasons. On March 12, the NCAA canceled the tournament outright, along with all other winter and spring championships.

Polls

Regular season

Season tournaments

Standings

PairWise Rankings
The PairWise Rankings (PWR) are a statistical tool designed to approximate the process by which the NCAA selection committee decides which teams get at-large bids to the 16-team NCAA tournament. Although the NCAA selection committee does not use the PWR as presented by USCHO, the PWR has been accurate in predicting which teams will make the tournament field.
	
For Division I men, all teams are included in comparisons starting in the 2013–14 season (formerly, only teams with a Ratings Percentage Index of .500 or above, or teams under consideration, were included). The PWR method compares each team with every other such team, with the winner of each “comparison” earning one PWR point. After all comparisons are made, the points are totaled up and rankings listed accordingly.
	
With 60 Division I men's teams, the greatest number of PWR points any team could earn is 59, winning the comparison with every other team. Meanwhile, a team that lost all of its comparisons would have no PWR points.

Teams are then ranked by PWR point total, with ties broken by the teams’ RPI ratings, which starting in 2013-14 is weighted for home and road games and includes a quality wins bonus (QWB) for beating teams in the top 20 of the RPI (it also is weighted for home and road).
	
When it comes to comparing teams, the PWR uses three criteria which are combined to make a comparison: RPI, record against common opponents and head-to-head competition. Starting in 2013–14, the comparison of record against teams under consideration was dropped because all teams are now under comparison.

Player stats

Scoring leaders
Updated as of games played on March 8, 2020.

GP = Games played; G = Goals; A = Assists; Pts = Points; PIM = Penalty minutes

Leading goaltenders
The following goaltenders lead the NCAA in goals against average, minimum 1/3 of team's minutes played.

GP = Games played; Min = Minutes played; W = Wins; L = Losses; T = Ties; GA = Goals against; SO = Shutouts; SV% = Save percentage; GAA = Goals against average

Awards

NCAA

Atlantic Hockey

Big Ten

ECAC

Hockey East

NCHC

WCHA

See also
 2019–20 NCAA Division II men's ice hockey season
 2019–20 NCAA Division III men's ice hockey season

References

 
NCAA